Jangal Tir Ahmad (also Romanized as Jangal Tīr Aḩmad; also known as Jangal) is a village in Gowharan Rural District, Gowharan District, Bashagard County, Hormozgan Province, Iran. At the 2006 census, its population was 120, in 29 families.

References 

Populated places in Bashagard County